Sticky monkeyflower is a common name for several plants and may refer to:

Diplacus aurantiacus
Diplacus viscidus